Duel is a 1971 American action-thriller television film directed by Steven Spielberg. It centers on a business commuter, played by Dennis Weaver, driving his car through California to meet a client. However, he finds himself chased and terrorized by the mostly-unseen driver of a semi-truck. The screenplay by Richard Matheson adapts his own short story of the same name.

Produced by Universal Television, Duel originally aired as a part of the ABC Movie of the Week series on November 13, 1971. It later received an international theatrical release in an extended version featuring scenes shot after the film's original TV broadcast. The film received generally positive reviews from critics, with Spielberg's direction being singled out for praise. It has since been recognized as an influential cult classic, one of the greatest films ever made for television.

Plot

David Mann, a middle-aged salesman driving on a business trip in a Plymouth Valiant sedan, encounters a dilapidated tanker truck driving slowly in the Mojave Desert. Mann passes the truck but it speeds up, roars past him, then resumes driving slowly. When Mann overtakes and passes it again, the truck blasts its horn. Mann pulls into a gas station and the truck parks next to him. Mann phones his wife, who is upset with him after an argument the previous night. The station attendant tells Mann he needs a new radiator hose, but Mann scoffs, believing that the attendant is trying to sell him an unnecessary replacement part.

Back on the road, the truck catches up and passes Mann, then blocks his path each time he attempts to pass it. After taunting Mann this way for a while, the driver waves him past, causing Mann to nearly hit an oncoming vehicle. Mann finally passes the truck using an unpaved turnout next to the highway, then glances at his rear window and waves. The truck briefly slows, but then begins tailgating Mann's car at increasingly high speed, the underpowered Plymouth barely able to stay ahead of the truck. Mann swerves his car off the road, loses control, and slams sideways into a fence across from a diner as the truck continues down the road.

Mann enters the restaurant to compose himself. Upon returning from the restroom, he sees the truck parked outside. He studies the patrons, identifies one who is wearing the same type of boots as the truck driver, and confronts him. The confused and offended patron beats Mann and leaves in a different truck. The pursuing truck leaves moments later, indicating that its driver never entered the diner.

Mann continues on his journey, stopping to help a stranded school bus. In the process, his front bumper gets caught underneath the bus's rear bumper. The truck appears in a tunnel down the road, causing Mann to panic. He and the bus driver free his car, and Mann flees as the truck helps push the school bus onto the road.

Mann stops at a railroad crossing and waits for a Southern Pacific freight train to pass through. The truck appears from behind and pushes Mann's car towards the oncoming train. Mann stands on the brake and shifts into reverse. As soon as the train passes, Mann floors the gas, crosses the tracks and runs off the road. The truck continues down the road and Mann slowly follows.

In an attempt to create more distance between himself and the truck, Mann drives at a very leisurely pace, as other motorists pass him. Once again, he encounters the truck, which has pulled off to the side of the road, waiting for him. The truck pulls out in front of him and starts antagonizing him again.

Mann stops at a gas station with a roadside animal attraction, consisting prominently of rattlesnakes. He calls the police from a telephone booth at the station. During the call, however, the truck drives through the booth, destroying it. Mann narrowly escapes, and is chased around the animal attraction by the truck. He is able to get into his car and speed away. Around a corner, he pulls off the road, hiding behind an embankment as the truck drives past.

After a long wait, Mann heads off again, but the truck is waiting for him down the road. Mann attempts to speed past, but the truck moves across the road, blocking him. He seeks help from an elderly couple in a car, but they depart when the truck backs up towards them at high speed. Determined to fight back, Mann speeds past the truck, which once again begins pursuing him. Mann swerves towards what appears to be a police car, only to realize that the vehicle belongs to a pest control company. Mann continues up a mountain road, aware that the truck will be unable to match his speed on a grade. Suddenly, the radiator hose on Mann's car breaks, causing the strained engine to overheat and begin to fail. Losing speed, he just manages to reach the summit. He then coasts downhill in neutral, with the truck following. Mann spins out and slams sideways into a cliff wall. He is able to restart his car and barely escape being crushed by the truck. Mann drives up a dirt road to the edge of a canyon, turning to face the truck. Mann jams the accelerator down with his briefcase and steers his car into the oncoming truck, jumping free at the last moment. The truck hits the car, which bursts into flames, obscuring the driver's view. The truck pushes the burning car over the edge of the cliff, then continues over the edge itself, and both vehicles crash into the canyon. Blood is seen dripping inside the truck's cab. Above the wreckage, Mann rejoices in his victory as the truck burns. Mann then sits down at the cliff's edge, exhausted, and throws pebbles in the direction of the destroyed truck as the sun sets.

Cast

Dennis Weaver as David Mann
Dale Van Sickel served as Weaver's stunt driver.
Jacqueline Scott as Mrs. Mann
Carey Loftin as Truck Driver
Eddie Firestone as Café Owner
Lou Frizzell as Bus Driver
Eugene Dynarski as Man in Café
Lucille Benson as Lady at Snakerama
Tim Herbert as Gas Station Attendant
Charles Seel as Old Man
Shirley O'Hara as Waitress
Alexander Lockwood as Jim, Old Man in Car
Amy Douglass as Old Woman in Car
Sweet Dick Whittington as Radio Interviewer

Production
Richard Matheson adapted the script from his own short story, which was originally published in Playboy magazine. Matheson got the inspiration for the story when he was tailgated by a trucker while on his way home from a golfing match with friend Jerry Sohl on November 22, 1963, the same day as the John F. Kennedy assassination. After a series of unsuccessful attempts to pitch the idea as an episode for various television series, he decided to write it as a short story instead. In preparation for writing the story, he drove from his home to Ventura and recorded everything he saw on a tape recorder.

The original short story was given to Spielberg by his secretary, who told him that it was being made into a Movie of the Week for ABC and suggested he apply to be the director. Duel was Spielberg's second feature-length directing effort, after "L.A. 2017", a 1971 episode of the NBC television series The Name of the Game.

Much of the movie was filmed in and around the communities of Canyon Country, Agua Dulce, and Acton, California. In particular, sequences were filmed on the Sierra Highway, Agua Dulce Canyon Road, Soledad Canyon Road, and Angeles Forest Highway. Many of the landmarks from Duel still exist today, including the tunnel, the railroad crossing, and Chuck's Café, where Mann stops for a break. The café building is still on Sierra Highway, but has housed a French restaurant called Le Chêne since 1980. The cliffs where the truck crashes at the end are Mystery Mesa, off Vasquez Canyon Road.

Production of the television film was overseen by ABC's director of movies of the week Lillian Gallo. Filming was completed in thirteen days—three longer than the scheduled—leaving ten days for editing prior to broadcast.

Spielberg lobbied for Dennis Weaver to star in the movie because he admired Weaver's work in Orson Welles' Touch of Evil. Weaver repeats one of his lines from Touch of Evil in Duel, telling the truck driver in the café that he has "another think coming."

In an interview by Weaver for the Archive of American Television, Spielberg said, "You know, I watch that movie at least twice a year to remember what I did".

Truck as antagonist
Matheson's script made it clear that the truck driver would be unseen aside from the few shots of his arms and boots that were necessary to the plot. Specifically, the driver's arms are shown twice, motioning Mann ahead, and his snakeskin boots are shown in the gas station scene near the beginning of the film. His motives are never revealed. In a DVD documentary feature, Spielberg observes that fear of the unknown is perhaps the greatest fear of all, and Duel plays heavily to that fear; the effect of not seeing the driver makes the real antagonist of the film the truck itself.

Vehicles
The car driven by Mann is a red Plymouth Valiant. Three cars were used in production. One was a 1970 model with a 318 V-8 engine. It had PLYMOUTH spelled out across the hood (though the brand name was covered with aluminum foil for the movie), as well as a trunk lid treatment characteristic of the 1970 model. A 1971 model with a 225 Slant Six was also used.

Spielberg did not care what kind of car was used in the film, as long as it was red, which would allow the vehicle to stand out from the landscape in the wide shots of the desert highway.

In what he called an "audition", Spielberg viewed a number of trucks. He selected the 1955 Peterbilt 281 over the contemporary, flat-nosed, "cab-over" style of trucks. The long hood of the older Peterbilt, its split windshield, and its round headlights give it more of a "face", adding to its menacing personality. Additionally, Spielberg said that the multiple license plates on the front bumper of the Peterbilt subtly suggest that the truck driver is a serial killer, having "run down other drivers in other states". For each shot, several people were tasked to make the truck successively uglier, adding oil, grease, fake dead insects and other blemishes.

The truck had had been manufactured as a single axle, and a tag-along axle had been added. A single truck was used for the original filming, so the shots of it falling off the cliff and being destroyed had to be completed in one take. Two more trucks were purchased to shoot the additional scenes for theatrical release.

Stock footage of both vehicles was used years later in "Never Give a Trucker an Even Break", the seventh episode of the Universal television series The Incredible Hulk, along with a small amount of new footage of the truck. This displeased Spielberg, but Universal owned the Duel footage, and could use it as they saw fit.

Use of sound 
Mann has very little dialogue in the movie, and the truck driver has none. As Spielberg stated in a behind-the-scenes documentary, he instead wanted to let the vehicles and setting "speak" for themselves. The film was shot on a tight schedule, based on a short story, and needed to fit within the 75minutes allotted by ABC; therefore, Spielberg focused on the visuals and menacing audio.

One break from the silences and heavy roar of the vehicles occurs after the initial chase scene, in Chuck's Café. Mann uses the restroom to collect himself and recover from his crash, and the audience is introduced to his inner thoughts. This diegetic use of sound was explained by Spielberg as Mann wanting to "physicalize" and "emote" his feelings, thus giving the audience an intimate relationship with Mann.

The use of sound and silence was a technique used by Spielberg to "keep the audience in suspense" throughout the entirety of the film, which he said was inspired by the work of Alfred Hitchcock. According to Spielberg, "sound has to fit like a glove... it makes everything scarier". As an example, towards the end of the film, Mann is awakened from sleep by noise similar to that of the truck, creating in the audience the expectation of a major turning point in the movie. The sound is revealed to actually be a passing train.

Along with the natural sounds in the film, Spielberg also incorporated a minimal score.

Music
The film's original score was composed by Billy Goldenberg, who had previously written music for productions directed by Spielberg, including his segment of the Night Gallery pilot and the Columbo episode "Murder by the Book", as well as scoring "L.A. 2017" with Robert Prince.

Spielberg and Duel producer George Eckstein told Goldenberg that because of the short production schedule, he would have to write the music during filming. He visited the production on location at Soledad Canyon to help get an idea of what would be required. Spielberg had Goldenberg ride in the tanker truck driven by stunt driver Loftin on several occasions. The experience terrified the composer at first, but he would eventually get used to it.

Goldenberg composed the score in about a week, for strings, harp, keyboards and heavy use of percussion instruments, with Moog synthesizer effects, but eschewing brass and woodwinds. He then worked with the music editors to "pick from all the pieces [they] had and cut it together" with the sound effects and dialogue. Much of his score ultimately was not used.

In 2015 Intrada Records released a limited edition album featuring the complete score, plus four radio source music tracks composed by Goldenberg.

Release
Duel was initially shown on American television as an installment of the ABC Movie of the Week. It was the 18th highest-rated television movie of the year, with a Nielsen rating of 20.9, and an audience share of 33%.

Extended version 
Following Duels successful broadcast, Universal decided to release the film theatrically. At 74 minutes, however, it was not long enough for this purpose, so Universal had Spielberg spend two days filming several new scenes to expand it to 90 minutes. A longer opening sequence was added with the car backing out of a garage and driving through the city. Additional scenes shot to lengthen the movie included Mann's telephone conversation his wife, the encounter with the broken-down school bus, and the confrontation at the railroad crossing. Expletives were also added, to make the film sound less like a television production.

The full-length film was released in Europe and Australia, and had a limited release in the United States. Duels success enabled Spielberg to establish himself as a movie director.

Home video 
Duel was released on VHS by Universal twice, first in 1982 under their MCA Videocassette Inc label, and again in 1990, under the brand name MCA Universal.

The film was released on Blu-ray disc on October 14, 2014, as part of the eight-film box set Steven Spielberg Director's Collection. It also had a standalone Blu-ray release on May 5, 2015.

Reception

Critical response

Duel received many positive reviews and is considered by some to be one of the greatest television movies ever made. On the review aggregation website Rotten Tomatoes, Duel has a score of 89% based on 45 reviews, with an average rating of 7.8 out of 10. The site's consensus is that "Duel makes brilliant use of its simple premise, serving up rock-solid genre thrills while heralding the arrival of a generational talent behind the lens". In TV (The Book), co-written by television critic Matt Zoller Seitz and Alan Sepinwall, Seitz named Duel as the greatest American television movie of all time, stating, "Almost fifty years after its initial broadcast, this stripped-down, subtly mythic action thriller retains a good deal of its power". Bravo included it at #67 in The 100 Scariest Movie Moments.

Interpretations of Duel often focus on the symbolism of Mann and the truck. Some critics follow Spielberg's own interpretation of the story as an indictment against the mechanization of life, both by literal machines and by social regimentation. The theme of gender performativity in Mann's quest to prove his manhood is another interpretation several observers have suggested.

Over the years, Duel has developed a strong following and a reputation as a cult film.

Accolades
Awards
Avoriaz Fantastic Film Festival
Grand Prize: 1973
Emmy
Outstanding Achievement in Film Sound Editing: 1972

Nominations
Golden Globe
Best Movie Made for TV: 1972
EmmyOutstanding Achievement in Cinematography for Entertainment Programming – For a Special or Feature Length Program Made for Television: 1972
Saturn AwardBest DVD Classic Film Release: 2003

The Devil on Wheels
In 2015, a Kickstarter campaign began to finance a documentary about the making of Duel. The film would be called The Devil on Wheels—a literal translation of the title under which Duel was released in Spain—and be directed by Enric Folch. The project was said to have "the approval of... NBC/DreamWorks". The website for The Devil on Wheels also collects information about Duel.

As of February 2023, The Devil on Wheels was listed as being in post-production.

References in other works
In film
The dinosaur roar that is heard in the original mono sound mix as the truck goes over the cliff is also heard in Spielberg's Jaws (1975) as the shark's carcass sinks into the ocean. Spielberg has said that he feels there is a "kinship" between Duel and Jaws, as they are both about "these leviathans targeting everyman." He has also said that inserting the sound effect into Jaws was "my way of thanking Duel for giving me a career." The sound effect originated in the 1957 B movie The Land Unknown.
The anime film Lupin III: The Mystery of Mamo (1978) parodies Duel in a chase scene in which Lupin and his colleagues, driving a red Austin Cooper, are pursued by a giant Kenworth W900 dispatched by the film's villain, Mamo.
The Snakerama gas station also appears in Spielberg's comedy movie 1941 (1979). Benson reprises her role as its proprietor. 
The horror anthology film Nightmares (1983) features a segment very similar to Duel, though with overt supernatural elements.Breakdown (1997) contains many visual and thematic nods to the movie.Fire Down Below (1997) contains a scene directly inspired by Duel, in which Steven Seagal's character is chased and nearly run off the road before luring a pursuing truck off of a cliff. Joy Ride (2001) is heavily influenced by Duel and contains many direct references. Monster Man (2003), starring Eric Jungmann, features a large truck terrorizing the occupants of a red car, though, unlike in Duel, the driver's face is shown.
The truck from Duel is seen in the film Torque (2004) causing a biker to wipe out shortly after a red four-door Valiant drives past.Throttle (2005) has a scene featuring a Dennis Weaver lookalike driving a red Plymouth Valiant.Wrecker (2015), starring Drea Whitburn and Anna Hutchison, is almost a shot-for-shot remake of Duel.

In television
 The special Tiny Toons' Night Ghoulery, on which Spielberg was an executive producer, includes a segment titled "Fuel" which parodies the film, starring Calamity Coyote and Little Beeper.
 In the Red Dwarf Series 8 episode "Only the Good...", Arnold Rimmer claims that a scar on the right side of his neck resulted from a friend attacking him with the case of a video of Duel.
 The film is parodied in the climax of  "The Secret of the Ghost Rig", the third episode of Scooby-Doo! Mystery Incorporated. 
 The opening scene of the Transformers: Prime episode "Nemesis Prime" pays homage to Duel.
 The Bob's Burgers Season 4 episode "Christmas in the Car" includes numerous references to Duel, as Bob is terrorized by a candy-cane shaped truck.
 Svengoolie aired Duel on November 5, 2016, and, responding to numerous viewer requests, again on February 18, 2023. 
 A Pinky and the Brain segment from the Spielberg-produced 2020 Animaniacs reboot includes a parody of Duel. The titular characters, in a car, are chased by a truck that eventually drives off a cliff. Pinky alludes to the fact that the driver was never seen. Shortly afterwards, E.T. is revealed to be the driver.

In print
In Stardust Crusaders, the third story arc of JoJo's Bizarre Adventure, the titles of the chapters of the "Wheel of Fortune" story reference Duel. In the story, the protagonists must deal with an assassin controlling a car resembling a Valiant.
In 2009, Stephen King and Joe Hill wrote a story titled "Throttle" that was a homage to Matheson's "Duel". IDW Publishing adapted "Duel" and "Throttle" into a four-issue comic series, Road Rage, with each of the two stories spanning two issues. Road Rage #1 was published on February 15, 2012.

In music
Steve Hackett's song "Duel" from the album Till We Have Faces was inspired by the film.
Kentucky-based band Nine Pound Hammer used a still of the truck pushing the Valiant over the cliff for the cover of their album Smokin' Taters!The Swervedriver song "Duel", from their album Mezcal Head, took its title from the film.
In David Lee Roth's 1994 video for the song "She's My Machine", Duels truck appears several times as a green tanker.
The animated video for "John Postal" by They Might Be Giants, from the album The Escape Team, reimagines Duel, substituting a postal truck for the tanker.

Note

References

Sources
 "Steven Spielberg and Duel: The Making of a Film Career" by Steven Awalt, Rowman & Littlefield (2014).
 The Complete Spielberg by Ian Freer, Virgin Books (2001).
 Steven Spielberg by James Clarke, Pocket Essentials (2004).
 Steven Spielberg The Collectors Edition by Empire Magazine (2004).
 The Steven Spielberg Story by Tony Crawley, William Morrow (1983).
 Duel'' by Richard Matheson, Tor Books Terror Stories Series (2003).

External links
 DUEL full film [1971, ABC Television Version]
 Duel movie script 1971

 
 
 
 
 From Director Steven Spielberg: Duel archive
 The Devil on Weels Documentary film

1971 films
1971 television films
1970s chase films
1970s road movies
1970s action thriller films
ABC Movie of the Week
American chase films
American road movies
American action thriller films
1970s English-language films
Films about automobiles
Films based on short fiction
Films based on works by Richard Matheson
Films directed by Steven Spielberg
Films scored by Billy Goldenberg
Films set in California
Films set in deserts
Films shot in California
Films with screenplays by Richard Matheson
Action television films
American thriller television films
Trucker films
Universal Pictures films
Films about road accidents and incidents
1970s American films